Mishmar HaShiv'a is a moshav in central Israel. Located near Beit Dagan, it falls under the jurisdiction of Sdot Dan Regional Council.

History
The village was founded in 1949 by demobilised soldiers on land which had belonged to the Palestinian village of Bayt Dajan, which was depopulated in the 1948 Arab–Israeli War. It was named in memory of the seven Notrim who were killed near Yazur on 22 January 1948.

References

Moshavim
Populated places established in 1949
Populated places in Central District (Israel)
1949 establishments in Israel